Mother Twilight is the 2001 studio album by Faun Fables. It was released through the label Drag City.

Track listing
"Begin" - 2:44
"Sleepwalker" - 3:37
"Shadowsound" - 5:02
"Hela" - 4:33
"Traveller Returning" - 6:22
"Train" - 3:20
"Beautiful Blade" - 4:28
"Mother Twilight" - 7:01
"Lightning Rods" - 3:34
"Moth" - 6:06
"Girl That Said Goodbye" - 4:20
"Washington State" - 2:16
"Catch Me" - 3:05
"Live Old" - 5:25

External links
Official Faun Fables web site

Faun Fables albums
2001 albums
Drag City (record label) albums